The Organisation of African, Caribbean and Pacific States (OACPS)  is a group of countries in Africa, the Caribbean, and the Pacific that was created by the Georgetown Agreement in 1975. Formerly known as African, Caribbean and Pacific Group of States (ACP),  the organisation's main objectives are sustainable development and poverty reduction within its member states, as well as their greater integration into the world's economy. All of the member states, except Cuba, are signatories to the Cotonou Agreement with the European Union.

The Cotonou Agreement (signed in Cotonou, Benin, in June 2000) is the successor to the Lomé Conventions. One of the major differences from the Lomé Convention is that the partnership is extended to new actors such as civil society, private sector, trade unions and local authorities. These will be involved in consultations and planning of national development strategies, provided with access to financial resources and involved in the implementation of programmes.

Many small island developing states are OACPS states; the fourth Lomé Convention was revised in 1995 in Mauritius and gives special attention to island countries in this agreement. Combined the EU and the members of the OACPS represent over 1.5 billion people and more than half of the seats at the United Nations.

States

Africa
The African OACPS countries negotiate in five Economic Partnership Agreements groups (West Africa, CEMAC, Southern Africa Development Community, East African Community, Eastern and Southern Africa) with the EU.

Caribbean
All countries of the Caribbean Community plus Dominican Republic group negotiate in the CARIFORUM Economic Partnership Agreement (EPA) with the European Union (EU).

Pacific
All developing member states of the Pacific Islands Forum group and Timor-Leste negotiate in the Pacific EPA with the EU.

North Atlantic EU OCTs
In this region are located the EU overseas countries and territories (OCTs) of Greenland and Saint Pierre and Miquelon, but there are no OACPS states.

South Atlantic dependent territories
In this region are located the U.K. overseas territories of Saint Helena, Ascension and Tristan da Cunha and Falkland Islands, but there are no OACPS states. Nevertheless, Saint Helena is developing links with the SADC EPA group.

Uninhabited territories
The uninhabited EU OCT does not participate in regional integration and does not receive development funding from the EU.
 French Southern and Antarctic Territories, located in the Indian Ocean
The uninhabited U.K. overseas territories are not OACPS states and do not receive development funding from the EU.
 British Indian Ocean Territory, located in the Indian Ocean
 South Georgia and South Sandwich Islands, located in the South Atlantic

Special designations
The Cotonou agreement recognises the specific challenges faced by less developed countries, land-locked countries, and islands in their economic development. Therefore, those countries are granted a more favourable treatment than other OACPS member countries. The text of the Cotonou agreement has been updated in 2005 and 2010, but the lists have not, despite the fact that the actual list of LDCs as defined by the United Nations has changed: Cape Verde has graduated from LDC status in December 2007, while Senegal has acquired the status in 2001 and Timor-Leste in 2003. The following lists should thus not be considered as the actual lists of OACPS LDCs and islands (a few islands are also not listed).

Annex VI of the Cotonou agreement lists the following designations:

Least-developed OACPS states
Angola
Benin
Burkina Faso
Burundi
Cape Verde
 the Central African Republic
Chad
Comoros
 the Democratic Republic of the Congo
Djibouti
Equatorial Guinea
Eritrea
Ethiopia
Gambia
Guinea
Guinea-Bissau
Haiti
Kiribati
Lesotho
Liberia
Madagascar
Malawi
Mali
Mauritania
Mozambique
Niger
Rwanda
Samoa
São Tomé and Príncipe
Sierra Leone
Solomon Islands
Somalia
Sudan
Tanzania
Tuvalu
Togo
Uganda
Vanuatu
Zambia

The Least developed OCTs are the following: Anguilla, Mayotte, Montserrat, Saint Helena, Turks and Caicos Islands, Wallis and Futuna, Saint Pierre and Miquelon.

Landlocked OACPS states
Botswana
Burkina Faso
Burundi
Central African Republic
Chad
Ethiopia
Lesotho
Malawi
Mali
Niger
Rwanda
Eswatini
Uganda
Zambia
Zimbabwe

Island OACPS states
Antigua and Barbuda
Bahamas
Barbados
Cape Verde
Comoros
Cuba
Dominica
Dominican Republic
Fiji
Grenada
Haiti
Jamaica
Kiribati
Madagascar
Mauritius
Nauru
Papua New Guinea
Saint Kitts and Nevis
Saint Lucia
Saint Vincent and the Grenadines
Samoa
São Tomé and Príncipe
Seychelles
Solomon Islands
Tonga
Trinidad and Tobago
Tuvalu
Vanuatu

See also

 ACP-EU Development Cooperation
 EU-ACP  Economic Partnership Agreements
 ACP-EU Joint Parliamentary Assembly
 Economic Partnership Agreements (EPA) with the ACP countries
 The Courier (ACP-EU) : The magazine of Africa-Caribbean-Pacific and European Union cooperation and relations
 Technical Centre for Agricultural and Rural Cooperation ACP-EU (CTA)
 Everything but Arms
 European Centre for Development Policy Management

References

External links

Secretariat of the African, Caribbean and Pacific Group of States
ACP-EU Joint Parliamentary Assembly
ACP-EU cooperation dossier of Euforic
African Voices: About EC Aid to Africa
The Courier - The Magazine of Africa, Caribbean, Pacific and European Union cooperation and relations
 CTA's magazine on agriculture in ACP countries, Spore
Website on EU cooperation for ACP countries 
 

 
.
International organizations based in Africa
International organizations based in Oceania
International organizations based in the Caribbean
International economic organizations
International trade organizations
Trade blocs
Economy of Africa
Economy of Oceania
Economy of the Caribbean
Foreign relations of the Caribbean
Intergovernmental organizations established by treaty
Organizations established in 1975
1975 establishments in Africa
1981 establishments in Oceania
1970s establishments in the Caribbean
1975 establishments in North America
1975 establishments in South America
Politics of Africa
Politics of Oceania
Politics of the Caribbean
United Nations General Assembly observers